Spiridon may refer to:

Given name 
 Spiridon (patriarch) (died 1389), Patriarch of the Serbian Patriarchate of Peć 1380–1389
 Saint Spyridon or Saint Spiridon (c. 270–348), saint honoured in both the Eastern and Western Christian traditions
 Spyridon Chazapis (1872–unknown), Greek swimmer 
 Spiridon Gopčević (1855–1928), Serbian astronomer and historian
 Spiridon Popescu (1864–1933), Romanian writer
 Spiridon Putin (1879–1965), Russian chef for Lenin and Stalin, grandfather of Vladimir Putin
 Spiridon Stais, Greek shooter
 Spiridon of Neva, according to Russian sources, the Swedish leader in the Battle of the Neva

Surname 
 Simona Spiridon, Romanian-Austrian handballer

Brand name 
 Spiridon, a brand name for the drug Spironolactone, a medication that is primarily used to treat fluid build-up due to heart failure, liver scarring, or kidney disease
 , German running magazine named after Spyridon Louis

Places
 Spiridon Peninsula, Alaska
 , Alaska
 , Alaska
 Saint Spiridon Orthodox Cathedral, King County, Washington

In fiction
 Spiridon, a planet featured in the Doctor Who serial Planet of the Daleks
 The title character of Spiridon the Mute a novel by Paschal Grousset

See also
Spyridon

Greek masculine given names